Rozanne Voorvelt (born 25 April 2001) is a Dutch water polo player for ZVL-1886 and the Dutch national team.

She participated at the 2018 Women's European Water Polo Championship.

References

External links
 

2001 births
Living people
Dutch female water polo players
World Aquatics Championships medalists in water polo